The Saskatchewan Applied Science Technologists & Technicians (SASTT) is Saskatchewan's independent certifying body for engineering/applied science technicians and technologists.

SASTT confers the post-nominal designations of C.Tech. (Certified Technician), and A.Sc.T. (Applied Science Technologist) which are symbols of achievement in engineering/applied science technology and are legally protected for use only by fully certified members in good standing. The designations are recognized across Canada by many employers and other engineering professionals through the efforts of provincial associations of engineering technology.

Until 2010, SASTT was a member of the Canadian Council of Technicians and Technologists (CCTT).  Through CCTT being a signatory, The association recognized international transferability through the Sydney Accord, the Dublin Accord and the Engineering Technology Mobility Forum, which confers the ability to award the designation IntET(Canada) for Technologists who wish to work internationally. In 2010, a number of different provincial associations of engineering technology left CCTT, to found Technology Professionals Canada. This leaves the international transferability of these titles in question.

The Saskatchewan Applied Science Technologists and Technicians, under the name The Society of Engineering Technicians and Technologists of Saskatchewan (SETTS), was established in 1965.

Certified Applied Science Technologists are bound by a specific code of ethics and rules of professional conduct.

The association is mandated and empowered by the Technologists and Technicians act of Saskatchewan.

See also
Engineering technologist
Engineering Technology

References

External links
Saskatchewan Applied Science Technologists & Technicians official page

Professional associations based in Saskatchewan
Organizations based in Regina, Saskatchewan
Professional associations based in Canada
Engineering societies based in Canada